Avondale is a suburb of Auckland, New Zealand. Located on the western Auckland isthmus, the suburb is often considered a part of West Auckland. It is located in the Whau local board area, one of the 21 administrative divisions for the Auckland Council.

Geography

Avondale is one of the westernmost suburbs of the Auckland isthmus, forming the eastern shores of the Whau River, an estuarial arm of the Waitematā Harbour.

History

European settlement

The eastern shores of the Whau River was originally known by European settlers as Te Whau, until the 1880s. Whau is the Māori language name for Entelea arborescens, a native tree. The first European settler in the area was John Sheddon Adam in 1843. In 1845, the first wooden bridge across the Whau River was built. Settlement of the area did not occur in larger numbers until the late 1850s, with the completion of Great North Road. The name Avondale was popularised by John Bollard, who arrived in the area in 1861 and named the area for the Avondale Forest in County Wicklow, Ireland. Bollard became a prominent community leader and a Member of Parliament, living in Avondale until his death in 1915.

Expansion was rapid, with churches, stores and a public hall built by 1867. In 1880, the North Auckland Line railway stations opened along the Auckland isthmus and West Auckland, extending to Helensville by 1881, which included a station at Avondale. The new connection to Auckland led to a significant increase in growth in the area. Taking advantage of the newly opened station, New Zealand businessman William Hunt opened a brickworks adjacent to the railway line at St Georges Road, which continued to manufacture clay goods until 1969. Other early industries in the Avondale area included tanneries and mills. Avondale also had numerous market gardens, especially on the Rosebank Peninsula. It was here that the "Hayward" cultivar of the Chinese gooseberry, later known as the kiwifruit, was developed by Hayward Wright. In the late 19th century, Chinese-New Zealander Chan Ah Chee purchased 26 acres at land at Avondale, using the land as market gardens.

Te Whau became the Avondale District on 5 June 1882. In 1888, the Avondale Jockey Club formed, and began holding events at the Avondale Racecourse. In 1912, the racecourse was used as a military training camp for the 3rd (Auckland) Mounted Rifles during World War I, as an airfield in the following year, and as a temporary hospital during the 1918 influenza pandemic.

Suburban development

From the mid-1920s Avondale became increasingly suburban. With a greater need to provide infrastructure for the area, the Avondale Borough Council planned to take out a large loan to pay for these costs. The residents of Avondale voted against this plan, and instead voted to amalgamate with Auckland City to the east, in the hope that the city would be better able to finance works projects. After the vote was successful, Avondale Borough was absorbed into the Auckland City in 1927.

In 1924, a new town hall was built for the Avondale Borough. After the merger with Auckland City, there was no longer an need for borough offices, and the town hall was repurposed as a cinema, now known as the Hollywood Cinema.

In 1963, LynnMall, the first American-style shopping centre was opened in the neighbouring suburb of New Lynn. This negatively affected many of the shops in Avondale throughout the 1960s and 1970s.

3 Guys supermarket

Albert Gubay began building his fifth 3 Guys supermarket in Avondale in 1974. It operated from September 1975 to June 1997, but was plagued with building consent issues and was eventually demolished. Auckland City Council took ownership of the site, selling part of it for private development in 2001.

Most of the site was still vacant in 2019. The site became popular for street art in 2017, and a structure was built to host street art in 2021.

A similarly named "Free Guys Supermarket" opened in Avondale during the COVID-19 pandemic to provide free groceries to low-income households.

Redevelopment

In 2017, the council-controlled organisation Panuku Development Auckland announced a major redevelopment of Avondale town centre, including a new library building, community and recreation centre, increased housing and local business development. Since the 2010s, medium and high-density housing has become more commonly seen in Avondale, including such developments as the Highbury Triangle, a purpose-built Kāinga Ora complex primarily for older residents.

A planned new construction in the area is the Whau River walkway, creating easier walking connections between Avondale and the suburbs on the western shores of the Whau River.

The Avondale spider

The so-called Avondale spider (Delena cancerides), an introduced species of a spectacular but harmless Australian huntsman spider, was for decades only found in the area surrounding Avondale, and thus received its New Zealand name. It was introduced to New Zealand in the mid-1920s, likely in a shipment of timber to the Aitkins Timber Yard in Patiki Road. The species was allowed to spread into neighbouring areas, so that its distribution pattern might help identify future dispersal patterns of introduced species. Since then, the spider has become a symbol of Avondale.

Demographics

Avondale had a population of 20,082 at the 2018 New Zealand census, an increase of 1,788 people (9.8%) since the 2013 census, and an increase of 2,517 people (14.3%) since the 2006 census. There were 5,985 households, comprising 10,086 males and 9,993 females, giving a sex ratio of 1.01 males per female, with 3,708 people (18.5%) aged under 15 years, 5,253 (26.2%) aged 15 to 29, 9,123 (45.4%) aged 30 to 64, and 1,998 (9.9%) aged 65 or older.

Ethnicities were 37.0% European/Pākehā, 11.1% Māori, 25.4% Pacific peoples, 36.4% Asian, and 4.7% other ethnicities. People may identify with more than one ethnicity.

The percentage of people born overseas was 47.2, compared with 27.1% nationally.

Although some people chose not to answer the census's question about religious affiliation, 36.5% had no religion, 38.6% were Christian, 0.7% had Māori religious beliefs, 8.2% were Hindu, 5.0% were Muslim, 2.8% were Buddhist and 2.7% had other religions.

Of those at least 15 years old, 4,776 (29.2%) people had a bachelor's or higher degree, and 2,415 (14.7%) people had no formal qualifications. 2,292 people (14.0%) earned over $70,000 compared to 17.2% nationally. The employment status of those at least 15 was that 8,478 (51.8%) people were employed full-time, 2,115 (12.9%) were part-time, and 729 (4.5%) were unemployed.

Local government 

The first local government in the area was the Whau Highway District, which formed in 1868. This was renamed the Avondale Road district in 1882. Avondale grew into a self-governing borough in 1922. The borough merged with the Auckland City in 1927. In November 2010, all cities and districts of the Auckland Region were amalgamated into a single body, governed by the Auckland Council.

Avondale is in the Whau local board area, which elects the seven-member Whau Local Board. Residents of Avondale also elect a single Whau ward councillor, who represents the area on the Auckland Council.

Mayors of Avondale Borough Council 
Between 1922 and 1927, the Avondale Borough had four mayors.

1922–1923 James Watkin Kinniburgh
1923–1927 William John Tait
1927–1927 Edward Ernest Copsey
1927–1927 Herbert Tiarks

Amenities

Education

 Avondale College is a state secondary (years 9-15) school with a roll of  students. It is one of the largest high schools in New Zealand. It shares the site with Avondale College. Both schools opened in 1945.
Avondale School was one of the earliest schools in Auckland, opening in 1860.
 Jireh Christian School is a state-integrated full primary (years 1-8) school which opened in 2018 at the site of Immanuel Christian School.
It opened in 1923.

All these schools are coeducational. Rolls are as of

Sports
The Avondale Jockey Club operates the Avondale Racecourse - one of only two gallops tracks in suburban Auckland. The racecourse is also the location of the Avondale Sunday markets, the largest in the country. The interior of the racecourse is occupied by several sports fields, which are used for rugby union, rugby league, soccer and cricket. A set of netball courts are located adjacent to the racecourse. Additional sports facilities are located along Rosebank Road, at Eastdale Reserve and Riversdale Reserve.

Transport
Avondale Railway Station is situated on the Western Line of Auckland's metropolitan rail network.

Libraries
Avondale has a local branch of the Auckland Libraries system.

Entertainment

The Hollywood Cinema
There were movies in the Avondale Town Hall from 1900, but it wasn't until the building was upgraded in 1915 and 1924 to be a more functional cinema, that they were shown on a regular basis. The hall has been used as a cinema and performing arts centre by a variety of managers and became officially known as The Hollywood Cinema in 1966 when it was taken over and run by Jan Grefstad, until his death in 2001. Over the years it became known for midnight showings of The Rocky Horror Picture Show and performances on a Wurlitzer organ. Under new ownership since 2015, it continues to show movies and present concerts by international artists such as Billy Bragg, and local musicians, including Marlon Willams.

Places of worship
Avondale has several places of worship, including multiple churches, a Hindu temple, a mosque, and a Seventh-Day Adventist Church Plant (ACTS Community Church).

References

Bibliography

External links 
Photographs of Avondale held in Auckland Libraries' heritage collections.

Suburbs of Auckland
Populated places around the Waitematā Harbour
Whau Local Board Area
West Auckland, New Zealand